Ranatunge Karunananda (21 May 1936 – 15 December 1974) was a Sri Lankan athlete. He was a long distance runner and represented Sri Lanka during the 1960s and 70s. He is widely regarded as the most spirited loser in the history of the Olympic Games, for what he accomplished at the 1964 Summer Olympics in Tokyo.

1964 Olympics
Karunananda represented Ceylon (as Sri Lanka was named at the time) in the 1964 Summer Olympics Men’s 5000 meters and Men’s 10,000 meters competitions. In the 10,000 meter race, Karunananda was soon overtaken by the leading athletes and was lapped four times when the winner, Billy Mills of the United States, broke the tape to finish the race. Karunananda continued to run after the others had finished the race. Spectators first started to jeer at him. But when he came around a second time, there was silence. Finally he finished the race amid cheers and applause.

Legacy
Japanese reporter Haruo Suzuki was one of the first reporters to have an interview with Karunananda following the race. Instantly, Japanese media started to acclaim Karunananda as a hero. When questioned, Karunananda told reporters: "The Olympic spirit is not to win, but to take part. So I came here. I took part in the 10,000 metres and completed my rounds."

Karunananda's Olympic story has been entered into Japanese school textbooks titled 'Uniform Number 67', 'Bottom Ranked Hero'.

Death
In 1974, Karunananda had been offered a job in Japan in appreciation of his deed. A few days before leaving Sri Lanka, however, Karunananda mysteriously died, drowning in the Namal Oya tank. Some theories say that he just disappeared. Karunananda’s wife suffered a mental breakdown following her husband’s death and the family was forced onto the streets. Later, one of the relatives offered to fund and take care of his family. The Sri Lankan government did not acknowledge his legacy or look after his family.

References

External links
 Ranathunga Karu  
1936 births 
1974 deaths 
Sri Lankan male long-distance runners 
Olympic athletes of Sri Lanka 
Athletes (track and field) at the 1964 Summer Olympics 
nananda's Son - +94777565671